Premiair is an aviation services and aircraft management operator based in Indonesia, serving domestic and international markets. The company is headquartered at Halim Perdanakusuma Airport in Jakarta.

In 2008, Premiair earned to Indonesia's top safety rank. It is one of only four Indonesian airlines that is allowed to fly to the European Union.

Business line
The airport offers VIP and corporate charter services, aircraft management services, ground handling and fixed-base operation services, hangar services, aircraft sales, oil and gas producers services.

Premiair subsidiaries 
Premiair has several subsidiaries:

 PT. Wira Jasa Angkasa (WJA), focusing io aircraft maintenance and supplies
 PT. Wira Adirajasa Dirgantara (WAD), focusing its business on fixed-base operations
 PT. Mitra Adirajasa Dirgantara (MAD), focusing on aviation consultancy and advising

Fleet

Current fleet
The Premiair fleet includes the following aircraft (as of August 2021):

Former fleet
Premiair previously operated the following aircraft:

References

External links
 Official website

Airlines of Indonesia